This page is the complete honour roll of the North Melbourne Football Club.

From 1869 till 1875 North competed in and helped organise the challenge cup. In 1876 the club amalgamated with Albert-park Football Club to form Albert-park cum North Melbourne FC.

In 1877 the club reformed as Hotham FC and joined the newly formed VFA as a founding club. North competed in the VFA from 1877 until 1924. In 1925 the club was promoted to the premier competition in the country, the VFL.

In 1990, with the addition of the Adelaide Football Club the VFL changed its name to the AFL. North continues to compete in the AFL to this day.

Challenge Cup years

Amalgamation years

VFA years

VFL years

AFL years

Notes

Dowling, G. (1997) The North Story - Official history of the North Melbourne Football Club

North Melbourne Football Club